Marilyn Burns (born 1956 or 1957) is a Canadian lawyer and politician who currently serves as the leader of the Alberta Advantage Party.  She was previously active in the Alberta Alliance Party and the Wildrose Party.

Born in Edmonton, Alberta, she was educated at a Christian college in Moose Jaw, at Athabasca University, and then at the University of Calgary Faculty of Law, from which she earned a Bachelor of Laws.  She articled with Ogilvie and Company, and since 2001 has been practicing has a personal injury lawyer with McCourt Law Offices in Edmonton.  Prior to practicing law, she worked jobs that included farm worker, waitress, piano instructor, deli clerk, school secretary, nurse's aide, and summer camp instructor.  She is a single mother of four children.

Burns ran in the 2004 Alberta general election in Stony Plain for the Alberta Alliance Party, and placed third of five candidates.  When party founder Randy Thorsteinson stepped down as leader in 2005, she ran in the ensuing leadership contest to replace him.  She finished second of four candidates, losing on the third and final ballot to Paul Hinman.  She was involved with the founding of the Wildrose Party of Alberta and, when that party joined with the Alberta Alliance to form the Wildrose Party in 2008, she joined the new party and served as president of its Edmonton-South West constituency association.  She opposed Wildrose's 2017 merger with the Progressive Conservatives (PCs) to form the United Conservative Party (UCP) on the grounds that she saw it as a takeover of Wildrose by the PCs, and was one of a group of about fifty disaffected Wildrose members who, rather than joining the UCP, founded the Alberta Advantage Party.  She was acclaimed as leader of that party at its inaugural convention in February 2018.  In the 2019 Alberta general election, she stood for election as the Alberta Advantage candidate in Edmonton-South West, where she finished in fourth place, with 0.9% of the vote.

Electoral record

2019 Alberta general election

2005 Alberta Alliance leadership election

2004 Alberta general election

References

21st-century Canadian politicians
21st-century Canadian lawyers
Alberta Alliance Party candidates in Alberta provincial elections
Alberta political party leaders
Athabasca University alumni
Canadian women lawyers
Female Canadian political party leaders
Lawyers in Alberta
Politicians from Edmonton
University of Calgary Faculty of Law alumni
Women in Alberta politics
Living people
Year of birth uncertain
1950s births
21st-century women lawyers
21st-century Canadian women politicians